Tai Hang Road is a major road on the north side of Hong Kong Island in Hong Kong. Starting low from Tai Hang at Tung Lo Wan Road, Causeway Bay, it winds up to So Kon Po and further up to the mid-levels of Jardine's Lookout and Mount Nicholson, passing through Wong Nai Chung Gap. This is a road along which there are a number of luxurious residential apartments, such as Illumination Terrace, Grand Deco Tower and YI, where many affluent upper-middle/ upper-class families call home.

The road meets Lai Tak Tsuen and Haw Par Mansion in Tai Hang.

See also

 List of streets and roads in Hong Kong
 Illumination Terrace

Tai Hang
Jardine's Lookout
Wong Nai Chung Gap
Causeway Bay
Roads on Hong Kong Island